Chauncey Depew Steele Jr. (October 26, 1914 – May 14, 1988) was a tennis player from the United States. Steele made 15 singles appearances in the U.S. National Championships during his career. Steele enjoyed golf and tennis at the Briarcliff Lodge, where his father Chauncey Depew Steele served as manager from 1923 to 1933.

His son, Chauncey Steele III, would also compete in the U.S. National Championships, as well as Wimbledon.

References

1914 births
1988 deaths
American male tennis players
Tennis people from New York (state)